Beverly A. Bodem was a Republican member of the Michigan House of Representatives, representing part of the northeastern Lower Peninsula from 1991 through 1998.

Born in Wisconsin in 1940, Bodem attended Wood County Teachers College, the University of Wisconsin, Lansing Community College, and Alpena Community College and studied elementary education and health sciences/nursing.

She held several positions with two radio stations and was a real estate sales associate for four years. Bodem also coordinated the health care assistant training program at Alpena Community College and worked for then-State Representative John Pridnia. She was a charter member of the Alpena General Hospital Auxiliary and served on several community boards.

References

1940 births
Living people
People from Alpena, Michigan
People from Wisconsin
Women state legislators in Michigan
Republican Party members of the Michigan House of Representatives
20th-century American politicians
20th-century American women politicians
University of Wisconsin–Madison alumni
21st-century American women